Stephen David Darby (born 15 January 1955) is an English football coach and former player. He is well known throughout Asia as a pundit for ESPN Star Sports.

Playing career
Darby started out as a goalkeeper for Liverpool Schools and FA Youth Team but never made it professionally and subsequently ended up at Tranmere Rovers before playing for teams in the US and Australia.

Coaching career
Darby obtained his UEFA A Licence in 1979. He became an official FIFA Instructor for the Oceania region in 1981 and was the Technical Director of the Australian Soccer Federation (former name) of governing body Football Federation Australia between 1990 and 1995.

He then moved on to coach Johor FA in 1997, where he enjoyed a successful spell, winning the Malaysia FA Cup and a league title. He left the club in 2001 to take charge of the Vietnam women's team, whom he led to a gold medal at the 2001 SEA Games. This was the first ever gold medal for Vietnamese football since reunification.

After that, he was appointed as Sheffield Wednesday's youth team coach under Terry Yorath, but remained there only for a season before taking over the reins at Singapore's Home United. In his four-year tenure as Home United manager, Darby led them to a league and cup double in 2003 and a semi-final finish at the 2004 AFC Cup.

At the end of his Home United contract, Darby was heavily linked to the vacant India manager's post. However, he did not take up that job, choosing instead to join Perak despite having offers from two other Malaysian clubs and a Vietnamese club.

He led Perak to the Super Cup in 2005, a second spot in the league 2006–07 season and to the Malaysia Cup final in 2006 and an AFC quarterfinal. It was the furthest a Malaysian club had gone in Asian Competitions at that time.

In October 2008, he became part of the Thailand national team's coaching staff.

In 2012, he spent a year as a coaching consultant in Asia for Everton and as a football advisor to the Manipur government in India.

In September 2013, Darby was appointed as Kelantan FC's coach. This was the third Malaysian team that he coached, after Johor and Perak. He became the assistant coach of Mumbai City FC in 2014 in the inaugural Indian Super League. At Mumbai, he coached Nicolas Anelka and Freddie Ljungberg, who were by then approaching retirement.

In 2015, he was appointed as the technical director of the Laos Football Federation and later as the national team's coach for the 2018 FIFA World Cup qualification phase. In this time, Laos obtained their first ever World Cup qualification points and its highest ever FIFA ranking. To date, he has coached in 70 international fixtures and is considered one of the most successful English coaches who worked abroad.

Personal life
Darby holds a Bachelor (Hons) in Physical Education from the University of Leeds and Post Graduate qualifications in Sports Administration from the University of Canberra. He also holds a TEFL Certificate from Cambridge. He speaks Arabic, French and a little Malay. His daughter, Quinn Elsa Darby, born in 2005, she is a talented Basketball and Lacrosse player. he returned to England in 2018 and is now a Football and media consultant producing many articles for Asian outlets and featuring on numerous podcasts. His biography by Antony Sutton "The Itinerate Coach" was published in October 2021 by Fairplay publishing.

Honours

Johor FA
Malaysia Premier League
 Winners (1): 1999
Malaysian FA Cup
 Winners (1): 1998

Vietnam
SEA Games Gold (first ever football gold) 2001
Order of Labour 2001

Home United
S.League (1): 2003
Singapore Cup (2): 2003 2005
AFC Cup semi final 2004
AFC Team of the Year Finalist 2004
AFC Coach of the Year Finalist 2004

Perak FA
Sultan Haji Ahmad Shah Cup
 Winners (1): 2005
AFC Cup Quarter Finals 2006

Laos National team
Highest ever FIFA Ranking
First World Cup Qualifying points

References

External links
 Interview in Mohun Bagan Official Website
 http://mohunbaganac.com/SEPT08/news_details.php?newsid=903
 https://web.archive.org/web/20071110023009/http://www.yob4ever.com/v2/modules.php?name=Content&pa=showpage&pid=21
 https://web.archive.org/web/20070927040830/http://www.espnstar.com/studio/studio_coldetail_1464322.html
 https://web.archive.org/web/20110810181522/http://www.kolkatafootball.com/indiafootball_news_2011/july21stpart_2011.html#bagan_coach

1955 births
Living people
Footballers from Liverpool
English footballers
Association football goalkeepers
Tranmere Rovers F.C. players
English expatriate footballers
English expatriate sportspeople in the United States
English expatriate sportspeople in Australia
Expatriate soccer players in the United States
Expatriate soccer players in Australia
English football managers
Bahrain national football team managers
East Riffa Club managers
Australia women's national soccer team managers
Sydney Olympic FC managers
Home United FC head coaches
Perak F.C. managers
Thailand national football team managers
Mohun Bagan AC managers
Kelantan FA managers
Laos national football team managers
Singapore Premier League head coaches
I-League managers
Women's national association football team managers
English expatriate football managers
English expatriate sportspeople in Bahrain
English expatriate sportspeople in Malaysia
English expatriate sportspeople in Singapore
English expatriate sportspeople in India
English expatriate sportspeople in Laos
Expatriate football managers in Bahrain
Expatriate soccer managers in Australia
Expatriate football managers in Malaysia
Expatriate football managers in Singapore
Expatriate football managers in India
Expatriate football managers in Laos
Alumni of the University of Leeds